Olisthopus is a genus of ground beetle native to the Palearctic (including Europe), the Near East and North Africa. It contains the following species:

 Olisthopus brevicornis Casey, 1913
 Olisthopus elburzensis (Morvan, 1977)
 Olisthopus elongatus Wollaston, 1854
 Olisthopus ericae Wollaston, 1854
 Olisthopus filicornis Casey, 1913
 Olisthopus fuscatus Dejean, 1828
 Olisthopus glabratus Brulle, 1839
 Olisthopus glabricollis (Germar, 1817)
 Olisthopus hispanicus Dejean, 1828
 Olisthopus humerosus Wollaston, 1858
 Olisthopus inclavatus Israelson, 1983
 Olisthopus innuens Casey, 1913
 Olisthopus iterans Casey, 1913
 Olisthopus maderensis Wollaston, 1854
 Olisthopus micans Leconte, 1848
 Olisthopus palmensis Wollaston, 1864
 Olisthopus parmatus (Say, 1823)
 Olisthopus pusio Casey, 1913
 Olisthopus rotundatus (Paykull, 1790)
 Olisthopus sibiricus J.Sahlberg, 1880
 Olisthopus sturmii (Duftschmid, 1812)

References

External links
Olisthopus at Fauna Europaea